A graphing calculator is a class of hand-held calculator that is capable of plotting graphs and solving complex functions. There are several companies that manufacture models of graphing calculators. Texas Instruments is a major manufacturer.

The following table compares general and technical information for a selection of common and uncommon Texas Instruments graphing calculators. Many of the calculators in this list have region-specific models that are not individually listed here, such as the TI-84 Plus CE-T, a TI-84 Plus CE designed for non-French European markets. These region-specific models are usually functionally identical to each other, aside from minor cosmetic differences and circuit board hardware revisions. See the individual calculators' articles for further information.

Programming language support

See also
Comparison of HP graphing calculators

References 

Texas Instruments calculators
Graphing calculators